The Wasserstein Generative Adversarial Network (WGAN) is a variant of generative adversarial network (GAN) proposed in 2017 that aims to "improve the stability of learning, get rid of problems like mode collapse, and provide meaningful learning curves useful for debugging and hyperparameter searches".

Compared with the original GAN discriminator, the Wasserstein GAN discriminator provides a better learning signal to the generator. This allows the training to be more stable when generator is learning distributions in very high dimensional spaces.

Motivation

The GAN game 
The original GAN method is based on the GAN game, a zero-sum game with 2 players: generator and discriminator.

The objective of the game is
The generator aims to minimize it, and the discriminator aims to maximize it.

A basic theorem of the GAN game states that

Repeat the GAN game many times, each time with the generator moving first, and the discriminator moving second. Each time the generator  changes, the discriminator must adapt by approaching the ideal
It merely keeps track of the likelihood ratio between the generator distribution and the reference distribution. At equilibrium, the discriminator is just outputting  constantly, having given up trying to perceive any difference.

Concretely, in the GAN game, let us fix a generator , and improve the discriminator step-by-step, with  being the discriminator at step . Then we (ideally) haveso we see that the discriminator is actually lower-bounding .

Wasserstein distance 
Thus, we see that the point of the discriminator is mainly as a critic to provide feedback for the generator, about "how far it is from perfection", where "far" is defined as Jensen–Shannon divergence.

Naturally, this brings the possibility of using a different criteria of farness. There are many possible divergences to choose from, such as the f-divergence family, which would give the f-GAN.

The Wasserstein GAN is obtained by using the Wasserstein metric, which satisfies a "dual representation theorem" that renders it highly efficient to compute:

A proof can be found in the main page on Wasserstein metric.

Definition 
By the Kantorovich-Rubenstein duality, the definition of Wasserstein GAN is clear:

Comparison with GAN 
In the Wasserstein GAN game, the discriminator provides a better gradient than in the GAN game.

Then the optimal Wasserstein critic  and the optimal GAN discriminator  are plotted as below:

For fixed discriminator, the generator needs to minimize the following objectives:

 For GAN, .
 For Wasserstein GAN, .

Similarly for the generator in Wasserstein GAN.

For Wasserstein GAN,  has gradient 1 almost everywhere, while for GAN,  has flat gradient in the middle, and steep gradient elsewhere. As a result, the variance for the estimator in GAN is usually much larger than that in Wasserstein GAN. See also Figure 3 of.

Consider training a GAN to generate ImageNet, a collection of photos of size 256-by-256. Thus, the gradient , creating no learning signal for the generator.

Detailed theorems can be found in.

Training Wasserstein GANs 
Training the generator in Wasserstein GAN is just gradient descent, the same as in GAN (or most deep learning methods), but training the discriminator is different, as the discriminator is now restricted to have bounded Lipschitz norm. There are several methods for this.

Upper-bounding the Lipschitz norm 

For example, the hyperbolic tangent function  satisfies the requirement.

Weight clipping 

This is the weight clipping method, proposed by the original paper.

Spectral normalization 

The spectral radius can be efficiently computed by the following algorithm:

By reassigning  after each update of the discriminator, we can upper bound , and thus upper bound .

The algorithm can be further accelerated by memoization: At step , store . Then at step , use  as the initial guess for the algorithm.

This is the spectral normalization method.

Gradient penalty 

Instead of strictly bounding , we can simply add a "gradient penalty" term for the discriminator, of formwhere  is a fixed distribution used to estimate how much the discriminator has violated the Lipschitz norm requirement.
The discriminator, in attempting to minimize the new loss function, would naturally bring  close to  everywhere, thus making .

This is the gradient penalty method.

Further reading 

 From GAN to WGAN
 Wasserstein GAN and the Kantorovich-Rubinstein Duality
 Depth First Learning: Wasserstein GAN

See also 

 Generative adversarial network
 Wasserstein metric
 Earth mover's distance
 Transportation theory

References

Notes 

Neural network architectures
Cognitive science
Unsupervised learning